Haberlandia lindacammae is a moth in the family Cossidae. It is found in Gabon, where it has been recorded from the Lopé Faunal Reserve and Bambidie logging camp. The habitat consists of forests.

The wingspan is about 23 mm for males and 27 mm for females. The forewings are deep colonial buff with several buffy olive lines. The hindwings are deep colonial buff with a reticulated pattern of light brownish olive.

Etymology
The species is named for Linda Lorna Camm.

References

Natural History Museum Lepidoptera generic names catalog

Endemic fauna of Gabon
Moths described in 2011
Metarbelinae
Taxa named by Ingo Lehmann